Jonathan Schmock (born February 26, 1956) is an American actor, television director, producer, writer and editorial cartoonist.

He has worked on numerous film and television projects including Ferris Bueller's Day Off, where he played the maitre d' in a fancy restaurant. Television roles include Big Time Rush, Blossom, Double Trouble, Arrested Development, Star Trek: Enterprise, The Golden Girls and The Big Bang Theory. Additional film credits include Some Kind of Wonderful, City of Industry, and Surf Ninjas. He has also worked as a developer for Sabrina the Teenage Witch and as a writer on Real Time with Bill Maher, Dharma & Greg, Blossom and Brotherly Love, which he co-created with Jim Vallely.

Filmography
Ferris Bueller's Day Off (1986) - Chez Luis Maitre D'
Shameless (2014) - Alan Kopchek

References

External links
 Jonathan Schmock's editorial cartoons
 
 

1956 births
Living people
20th-century American male actors
21st-century American male actors
American male film actors
American male television actors
American television directors
Television producers from California
American television writers
American male television writers
Male actors from San Diego
Screenwriters from California